Condyle may refer to:
 Condyle (anatomy), the round prominence at the end of a bone
 Condyle septiform, an intrusion of the endocarp into the seed cavity of flowering plants like Abuta

ca:Còndil
de:Kondylus
es:Cóndilo